Like to Get to Know You is the second studio album by Spanky and Our Gang, released in 1968. It is the first of their albums to exhibit their signature sound, partially owing to it being produced by two different people than their debut album.

Reception

Writing for Allmusic, music critic Bruce Eder wrote the album "was harder-rocking, bluesier, and more inventive in its folk stylings than anything on their debut album. The mix of sounds was actually quite startling in its own time and is engaging even 30 some years later."

Track listing
 "The Swingin' Gate" (John Ferrell, Geoffrey Meyers) lead vocals: Malcolm Hale, John Seiter, Spanky McFarlane – 2:14
 "Prescription for the Blues" (Little Brother Montgomery, Bruce Saunders) lead vocals: Spanky McFarlane – 3:07
 "Three Ways from Tomorrow" (Lefty Baker) lead vocals: Lefty Baker– 3:25
 "My Bill" (Bob Dorough, Daniel Greenburg, Monte Ghertler) – 2:27
 "Sunday Mornin'" (Margo Guryan) lead vocals: Spanky McFarlane – 3:54
 "Echoes (Everybody's Talkin')" (Fred Neil) lead vocals: Malcolm Hale – 3:10
 "Suzanne" (Leonard Cohen) – 3:47
 "Stuperflabbergasted" (Bruce Summers, Carlos Bernal) lead vocals: Lefty Baker– 1:10
 "Like to Get to Know You" (Stuart Scharf) lead vocals: Lefty Baker, Malcolm Hale, Kenny Hodges, Spanky McFarlane – 2:15
 "Chick-a-Ding-Ding" (Stuart Scharf) lead vocals:  Nigel Pickering, Spanky McFarlane – 2:23
 "Stardust" (Hoagy Carmichael, Mitchell Parish) lead vocals: Spanky McFarlane, Nigel Pickering – 3:32
 "Coda (Like to Get to Know You)" (Stuart Scharf) lead vocals: Lefty Baker, Malcolm Hale – 0:59

Personnel
Spanky and Our Gang
 Spanky McFarlane - vocals
 Malcolm Hale - lead guitar, trombone, vocals
 Lefty Baker - lead guitar, banjo, vocals
 Nigel Pickering - rhythm guitar, vocals
 Kenny Hodges - bass, vocals
 John Seiter - drums, vocals

The band recorded the instrumental tracks for "Three Ways from Tomorrow," "Suzanne," and "Stuperflabbergasted."  Studio musicians recorded the rest
Mike Deasy - guitar
Walter Raim - 12-string guitar
Chet Amsterdam, Larry Knechtel, Richard Davis - bass
Red Rhodes - steel guitar
Artie Schroeck - organ, piano
Bill LaVorgna, Donald MacDonald, Hal Blaine - drums
Lee Katzman - trumpet

References

1968 albums
Mercury Records albums
Spanky and Our Gang albums
Albums produced by Bob Dorough
Albums produced by Stuart Scharf